Krishna ...Aayo Natkhat Nandlal     is a 2006 computer-animated Indian feature film.  It is the first Hindi computer-animated film and was theatrically released in India on 29 September 2006.  The film is based on the legends of the deity Krishna.

Music
Aao Padhare Krishna - Sukhwinder Singh
Aayo Nathkhat Nandlala - Alisha Chinoy, Anupam Amod, Carol
Baat Hai Yeh To - Sonu Nigam
Brindavan - Rajendra Shiv
Brindavan Dandiya Mix - Rajendra Shiv
Krishna Kaal - Kailash Kher
Krishna Theme - Instrumental
Makhan Koi - Kumar Sanu
Makhan Koi v2 - Kumar Sanu, Sunidhi Chauhan
Nathkhat Nandlala  (Remix) - N/A

See also
List of animated feature-length films
List of indian animated feature films

References

2006 films
2006 computer-animated films
Indian animated films
2000s Hindi-language films
Hindu mythological films
Animated films based on Mahabharata
Films about Krishna